The 2008 Cornell Big Red football team was an American football team that represented Cornell University in the 2008 NCAA Division I FCS football season. They were led by fifth-year head coach Jim Knowles and played their home games at Schoellkopf Field in Ithaca, New York. Cornell finished the season 4–6, 2–5 in Ivy League play, to finish in sixth place. Cornell averaged 7,075 fans per game.

Schedule

References

Cornell
Cornell Big Red football seasons
Cornell Big Red football